Pikule  is a village in the administrative district of Gmina Janów Lubelski, within Janów Lubelski County, Lublin Voivodeship, in eastern Poland.

References

Pikule